Lagoa dos Patos (English: Ducks' Lagoon) is the largest lagoon in Brazil and the largest coastal lagoon in South America. It is located in the state of Rio Grande do Sul, southern Brazil.

The Jacuí-Guaíba and Camaquã Rivers empty into it, while the navigable São Gonçalo Channel, which enters Lagoa dos Patos near the town of Pelotas, connects Lagoa dos Patos to Lagoa Mirim to the south. The Rio Grande, at the south end of Lagoa dos Patos, forms the outlet to the Atlantic.

This lagoon is evidently the remains of an ancient depression in the coastline shut in by sand bars built up by the combined action of wind and current. The shallow lagoon is located at sea level and its waters are affected by the tides, normally they are brackish only a short distance above the Rio Grande outlet, but this can vary a lot. In droughts and favorable winds, sea water can be carried up to almost the entire lagoon.

The lagoon's largest and most fertile island is the Ilha dos Marinheiros, which is located near the eastern shore. The island is geopolitically part of the municipality of Rio Grande.

The lagoon hosts a rich biodiversity, including fresh- and brackish water fish, and water birds such as black-necked swan, coscoroba swan and Chilean flamingo. Top predators from ocean ecosystem, notably common bottlenose dolphins, can sometimes be seen at Lagoa dos Patos and exceptionally southern right whales are found at the Rio Grande outlet.

Towns and cities on coast

Rio Grande
Pelotas
São José do Norte
São Lourenço do Sul
Tapes

References

Patos
Landforms of Rio Grande do Sul